On 21 March 1920 local elections were held in Zagreb, the first ones in the newly formed Kingdom of Serbs, Croats and Slovenes. The incumbent mayor was Stjepan Srkulj from the Croatian Union party, who took office in 1917. Svetozar Delić of the Socialist Workers' Party of Yugoslavia was elected mayor, but his term lasted only six days before being suspended by the government. New elections were called for 18 June 1920.

Results

Mayoral elections

At the meeting of the City Assembly on 16 April 1920 it was to be decided who will be the new mayor in a two-round voting system. In the first round of the vote Svetozar Delić of the Socialist Workers' Party of Yugoslavia (SRPJ(k)) gained 22 votes, incumbent mayor Stjepan Srkulj from the Croatian Union (HZ) received 14 votes, Ivan Ancel from the Democratic Party (DS) 4 votes, Milan Krešić from the DS one vote, and four ballots were not valid (empty).  Svetozar Delić and Stjepan Srkulj each failed to get more than 50%, but managed to get into the second round. The second round was won by Delić with 27 votes against Srkulj's 14.

Aftermath

The Croatian-Slavonian Provincial Government led by Croatian Ban Matko Laginja suspended the election of Svetozar Delić, relieving him of his duty, and named Dragutin Tončić as the government commissioner. On 20 April the government suspended the SRPJ(k) delegates and called for a new election for 20 seats in the City Assembly on 18 June 1920. Dragutin Tončić was named the acting mayor on 5 May 1920.

References

See also
List of mayors of Zagreb
1920 Kingdom of Serbs, Croats and Slovenes Constitutional Assembly election

Zagreb 1920-03
Elections in Zagreb
Zagreb 1920-03
Zagreb 1920-03
Zagreb local election 1920-03
Local election 1920-03